Morguard Corporation is a Canadian real estate company, based in Mississauga, Ontario. It owns retail, residential, office, industrial, and hotel properties, as well as managing real estate and financial investments for institutional investors.  As of October 2017, it owned $9.4 billion in real estate, and managed an additional $12.6 billion.

Some of its owned properties are through its controlling ownership in two publicly-listed real estate investment trusts, Morguard REIT and Morguard North American Residential REIT, and the publicly-listed Temple Hotels. It is a public company listed on the Toronto Stock Exchange.

History 
Morguard was founded in 1905 as D. Ackland & Son Limited.  It originally made carriage parts, but transitioned into automobile parts in the 1910s.  In 1960, it renamed itself Acklands Limited.  At some point, it transitioned to being a wholesale distributor of automobile and industrial parts, as opposed to a manufacturer.  Financial problems at the company in the 1980s led to the current president, K. Rai Sahi, taking control of the company in 1990.  The company sold its industrial parts distribution to W.W. Grainger in 1996 for $250 million USD; this division was renamed Acklands-Grainger.  In 1997, it sold half of automotive group to General Parts.  In 1997, Acklands began investing in real estate, and was renamed Acktion Corporation.  It eventually sold its remaining auto parts distribution business to focus on real estate.

Notable acquisitions by Acktion include Goldlist Properties and Revenue Properties. One of its investments was Morguard REIT, a newly formed real estate investment trust.  Morguard REIT had been launched by Morguard Investment Services, which had been founded in 1966, to sell mortgages to pension funds.  It expanded to real estate in the 1970s.   After investing in a number of other Morguard companies, Acktion renamed itself Morguard Corporation in 2002.

Morguard North American Residential REIT had an IPO in 2012, with properties spun-off from Morguard Corporation.

Business 
Morguard owns and manages retail, residential, office, industrial, and hotel properties, as well as financial investments.  As of October 2017, of its $16.2 billion in owned and managed real estate, 37% are retail, 26% are residential, 25% are offices, 9% are industrial, and the remaining 3% are hotels.  Of its real estate assets, 45% are in Ontario, 15% are in Alberta, 13% are in British Columbia, 10% are in the rest of Canada, and the remaining 17% are in the United States.  Morguard REIT owns $2.9 billion in assets, primarily shopping centres and offices.  Morguard North American Residential REIT owns $2.5 billion in assets, primarily multi-residential properties in the United States and Canada.  Temple Hotels owns $500 million in Canadian hotel properties.

As of January 2017, CEO K. Rai Sahi owned approximately 55% of shares in Morguard Corporation.

Properties

Shopping centres 
, Morguard REIT (MRT) owns a diversified real-estate portfolio of 47 commercial properties across six provinces of Canada. The following are Morguard-owned shopping centres that have an area of at least .

Owned

Managed 

 Bonnie Doon Centre in Edmonton, Alberta 
 New Sudbury Centre in Sudbury, Ontario
 Sevenoaks Shopping Centre in Abbotsford, British Columbia 
 Coquitlam Centre in Coquitlam, British Columbia
 Intercity Shopping Centre in Thunder Bay, Ontario
 Place Rosemere in Rosemere, Quebec
 Lawson Heights in Saskatoon, Saskatchewan

Hotels

Offices 
The following are Morguard-owned office spaces that have an area of at least 
 750 Burrard Street in Vancouver, British Columbia
CBC Ottawa Broadcast Centre in Ottawa, Ontario
Jean Edmonds Towers in Ottawa, Ontario
Place Innovation in St. Laurent, Quebec
 Penn West Plaza in Calgary, Alberta (Morguard REIT)
 Rice Howard Place in Edmonton, Alberta (20% ownership)

See also 
 Morguard Investments Ltd. v. De Savoye

References 

Companies listed on the Toronto Stock Exchange
Real estate companies of Canada
Companies based in Mississauga